Oregon Ballot Measure 80, also known as the Oregon Cannabis Tax Act, OCTA and Initiative-9, was an initiated state statute ballot measure on the November 6, 2012 general election ballot in Oregon. It would have allowed personal marijuana and hemp cultivation or use without a license and created a commission to regulate the sale of commercial marijuana. The act would also have set aside two percent of profits from cannabis sales to promote industrial hemp, biodiesel, fiber, protein, and oil.

Measure 80 was defeated 53.44%-46.56%.

Ballot qualification
OCTA organizers stated a goal of collecting 130,000 signatures of registered Oregon state voters before submitting a request to the Secretary of State for ballot inclusion. The deadline for turning in signatures was July 6, 2012, and was declared qualified to appear on the November 2012 ballot on July 13.

Certified Ballot Title 
Allows personal marijuana, hemp cultivation/use without license; commission to regulate commercial marijuana cultivation/sale

Result of a "Yes" Vote: "Yes" vote allows commercial marijuana (cannabis) cultivation/sale to adults through state-licensed stores; allows unlicensed adult personal cultivation/use; prohibits restrictions on hemp (defined).

Result of a "No" Vote: "No" vote retains existing civil and criminal laws prohibiting cultivation, possession and delivery of marijuana; retains current statutes that permit regulated medical use of marijuana.

Summary: Currently, marijuana cultivation, possession and delivery are prohibited; regulated medical marijuana use is permitted. Measure replaces state, local marijuana laws except medical marijuana and driving under the influence laws; distinguishes "hemp" from "marijuana"; prohibits regulation of hemp. Creates commission to license marijuana cultivation by qualified persons and to purchase entire crop. Commission sells marijuana at cost to pharmacies, medical research facilities, and to qualified adults for profit through state-licensed stores. Ninety percent of net goes to state general fund, remainder to drug education, treatment, hemp promotion. Bans sales to, possession by minors. Bans public consumption except where signs permit, minors barred. Commission regulates use, sets prices, other duties; Attorney General to defend against federal challenges/prosecutions. Provides penalties. Effective January 1, 2013; other provisions.

Stance on initiative

In support of passing the measure
Pacific Green Party
 Oregon NORML
 United Food and Commercial Workers, Local 555
 Former Secretary of State Bill Bradbury
 State Representative Peter Buckley

In opposition of passing the measure
 Governor John Kitzhaber

See also 

 Oregon Ballot Measure 91 (2014), subsequent successful effort to legalize recreational use of cannabis in Oregon
 Cannabis in Oregon
 Controlled substances in Oregon
 Decriminalization of non-medical cannabis in the United States

Similar initiatives
 California Proposition 19 (2010)
 Colorado Amendment 64
 Washington Initiative 502

References

External links
 Oregon Cannabis Tax Act 2012
 Initiative 9 status report

2012 cannabis law reform
Cannabis ballot measures in the United States
Cannabis law in Oregon
2012 Oregon ballot measures